Abohar is a city and municipal corporation in the Fazilka district of the Indian state of Punjab, southeast of Fazilka city and northeast of Sri Ganganagar. It is near the India-Pakistan border. Abohar's population is 211745. The city is known for kinnow production and accounts for 60% of the country's produce.

Demographics
According to the 2011 Indian census, Abohar city had a population of 145,302, of which 76,984 were males and 68,318 were females.

Religion

Majority of the people living in Abohar follows Hinduism, with a significant Sikh minority.

Languages

Punjabi is the official language of the city and is spoken by the majority. Other major languages spoken are Bagri and Hindi.

Wildlife sanctuary
Abohar is home to the Abohar Wildlife Sanctuary, which provides a free-range sanctuary for black bucks.  The open sanctuary is spread over an area of 18,650 hectares across farmlands and villages. The Abohar Wildlife Sanctuary is located in the Fazilka District of Punjab. The formation of sanctuary relates to a unique success story of wildlife conservation in which people of Bishnoi community united themselves for protecting the Black Buck which is regarded as a sacred animal by them. It is also the State Animal of Punjab. It is home to several varieties of flora and fauna viz. Albizia lebbeck, Acacia nilotica, Azadirachta indica, A. tortilis, Nilgai, porcupine, hare, jackal, etc.

References

Cities and towns in Fazilka district
https://www.gktoday.in/question/the-abohar-wildlife-sanctuary-is-located-in-which